Adolf Hermann Struck (1877–1911) was a German sightseer and writer. He is known for his travelogue Makedonische Fahrten and for surveying the Xerxes Canal in Northern Greece on his own in 1901.

Works 
Makedonische Fahrten, Vienna and Leipzig, (1907).
Der Xerxeskanal am Athos. Neue Jahrbücher for das klassiche Altertum: Geschichte und Literatur, 10 (1907).
Mistra. Eine mittelalterliche Ruinenstadt. Streifblicke zur Geschichte und zu den Denkmälern des fränkisch-byzantinischen Zeitalters in Morea. Vienna, A. Hartleben, (1910).
Zur landeskunde von Griechenland. Kulturgeschichtliches und wirtschaftliches. Frankfurt am Main., H. Keller, (1912).

References

1877 births
1911 deaths
German archaeologists
German travel writers
Date of birth missing
Date of death missing
20th-century archaeologists
20th-century German non-fiction writers
20th-century German male writers